KRAI (550 AM) is a radio station broadcasting a country music format. Licensed to Craig, Colorado, the station is currently owned by Don Tlapek, through licensee Blizzard Broadcasting, LLC The radio station was founded by George Oliver Cory.

History
KRAI went on the air in 1948 at 1230 kHz. Broadcasting with 250 watts, KRAI was owned by Newel S. Cahoon's Craig Broadcasting Company; the Northwestern Colorado Broadcasting Company acquired it in 1949, and George Oliver Cory consolidated his ownership in 1951. In 1955, KRAI was approved to move to 550 at 1,000 watts day and 500 night; it increased its daytime power to the present 5,000 watts in 1968.

References

External links

RAI